The Tour do Brasil, also known as the International Cycling Tour of the State of São Paulo is a road cycling stage race held in the state of São Paulo. The race exists since 2004 as an elite men's competition over a prologue and 8 to 9 stages. The race is currently a 2.2 event in the UCI America Tour.

Past winners

References 
 Results at cyclingwebsite.net

 
Cycle races in Brazil
UCI America Tour races
Sport in São Paulo (state)
Recurring sporting events established in 2004
2004 establishments in Brazil